A gat is a Korean traditional hat worn by men along with hanbok (Korean traditional clothing) during the Joseon period. It is made from horsehair with a bamboo frame and is partly transparent.

Most gat are cylindrical in shape with a wide brim on a bamboo frame. Before the late 19th century, only noble class men could wear gat, which represented their social status and protected their topknots.

Artisans who make gat are called ganniljang, from gannil (a compound of two words gat and il (work); "gat making") + jang ( "artisan, craftsperson, master of a craft"). As gannil requires artisanship throughout a complex series of techniques involving an array of materials, it has been designated as Intangible Cultural Property No. 4 on December 24, 1964.

History
The origins of gat date back to ancient times. Usually, the following hats are considered to be the first specimens of what is known as gat today: the so-called iphyeong baekhwa pimo from Geumnyeongchong, an ancient Silla tomb located in Gyeongju, and the pan-shaped gat which is distinct from ordinary hats in pattern and shape and is depicted on the murals of the Gamsinchong(), an ancient Goguryeo tomb.  Even in the modern era, the hat was worn commonly by elders and rural peoples until the late 20th century.

Colors and types
Colors and types of gat were differentiated by circumstances and/or social status.

During the Joseon period, black gat were restricted to men who had passed the gwageo, or civil service examinations. In narrow definition, the term gat refers to the heungnip.

A white gat was worn during times of national mourning. It is crafted in the same manner as a black gat but from sambe (hemp), consistent with traditional Korean hempen mourning garb.  

A red gat was worn by military officers of Joseon. Its color comes from red lacquer.

Commoners wore a variant called paeraengi which was woven from split bamboo.

Presence in cultural industry
In the South Korean TV series Kingdom from 2019, gat is worn by the actors to represent each character's social class.

See also
 Culture of Korea
 Damao (hat)

Notes

External links

 Gat, Traditional Headgear in Korea by the National Research Institute of Cultural Heritage
 "Master Artisan of Horsehair Hat Making" 
 "Gat, Encyclopeida of Korean Culture" 

Hats
Korean headgear